Loir-et-Cher is a department in the Centre-Val de Loire region of France. Its name is originated from two rivers which cross it, the Loir in its northern part and the Cher in its southern part. Its prefecture is Blois. The INSEE and La Poste gave it the number 41. It had a population of 329,470 in 2019.

History

The department of Loir-et-Cher covers a territory which had a substantial population during the prehistoric period. However it was not until the Middle Ages that local inhabitants built various castles and other fortifications to enable them to withstand a series of invasions of Normans, Burgundians, the English and others.

The economy is quite flourishing: there are shops in valley, and agriculture is prominent in the region of the Beauce and the Perche to the Sologne which were prosperous until the 17th century.
However, politically, the region remained quartered between the neighboring earldoms and duchies .
In 1397, the House of Orleans became the possession of the Comté of Blois.
In 1497, Louis d’Orleans (23rd count hereditary of Blois) was crowned with the name of Louis XII. It was the beginning of the importance of Blois and of the Blaisois in the politic life of the French, impressive especially under the last Valois.
At this time, kings and important financiers competed to build castles and elegant abodes which are today an important part of the French national heritage due to their quantity, significance, and worth. (Chambord, Blois, Cheverny and so on.)

After that, there were religious wars which were extremely ferocious under Charles IX's reign.
In 1576 and 1588, the General Estates convened in Blois.
L’Orléanais, le Berry, la Touraine, le Perche et le Maine occupied le Loir-et-Cher and its provinces in 1790.
The Loir-et-Cher's birth as a department was very difficult and laborious.
On 29 September 1789, the constitution's advisory board made a report in which he wanted to attribute one of the 80 departments to Blois. However, some cities and canton capitals disagreed, such as Tours and Orleans. Inside of the department, Montrichard turns to Amboise and Tours, Saint-Aignan wants to turn to the Berry and Salbris to Vierzon.

Finally, Orleans gave Blois an important part of the Sologne except Beaugency and Tours didn't give Amboise.
The department was founded 4 March 1790, in accordance with the law of 22 December 1789. It is constituted of some old provinces of the Orleanais and of the Touraine along with a Berry's plot (left bank of the Selles en Berry's Cher which becomes Selles sur Cher, to Saint-Aignan). 
The department's constriction in its centre and the maximum stretching out in its surface area beyond the Loir on the North and the Cher on the South is due to these tribulations.
After the victory of the Coalises during the Waterloo's battle (18 June 1815), the Prussian's troops occupied the department from June 1815 to November 1818. ( to learn more about it, go on to "France’s occupation at the end of the First Empire")

The poet Pierre de Ronsard, the inventor Denis Papin, and the historian Augustin Thierry come from here. Other well-known people are also associated with this department, such as François the First, Gaston d’Orleans, the Marshall Maunoury, and the abbot Gregoire (Bishop of Blois, elected at the Constituante). In the artistic domain, there is the compositor Antoine Boesset (1587–1643), musician in the Louis XII de France's court, who was the head of the Music of the King's Bedroom from 1623 to 1643.

The Loir-et-Cher's department is a part of the Centre Region. It is adjacent of these departments : the Eure-et-Loir, the Loiret, the Cher, the Indre, the Indre-et-Loire and the Sarthe.
Due to its surface area of 6 343 km2, it is the 31st largest department in the nation. It has a privileged geographical situation because it is in the center of the Centre region and near the Paris basin.
An axe lively and dynamic, brings Blois closer (the department's administrative center) to both the urban conglomerations near it: Orleans and Tours.
Located on the boundaries of the Perche, the Beauce, the Sologne and the Touraine, it finds its territorial identity in the diversity of its geography and its landscapes. Cut in its middle by the Loire, it shows an image of balance and diversity.

In 1989, American-based animators Andreas Deja, Glen Keane, and Tom Sito, and draftsmen Jean Gillmore, Thom Enriquez, and Hans Bacher launched an expedition to the chateau to do their research for the animated adaptation of "Beauty and the Beast".

Geography
Loir-et-Cher is a part of the modern region of Centre-Val de Loire.  Adjacent departments are Eure-et-Loir to the north, Loiret to the north-east, Cher to the south-east, Indre to the south, Indre-et-Loire to the south-west, and Sarthe to the west.

The department comprises 6,314 km2, which makes it the 31st largest of the French departments in terms of area. The line of the river Loire traverses the land, ensuring easy communication between its own capital, Blois, and the vibrant cultural and commercial centres of Tours to the west and the fringes of the Seine-Paris basin at Orléans to the east.

Its main rivers are the Loire, on which its prefecture (capital) Blois is situated, the Loir and the Cher.

Principal towns

The most populous commune is Blois, the prefecture. As of 2019, there are 6 communes with more than 5,000 inhabitants:

Demographics
The inhabitants of the department are called the Loir-et-Chériens.

Politics

The preseident of the Departmental Council is Philippe Gouet (UDI), elected in July 2021.

Current National Assembly Representatives

Tourism

Châteaux 

Loir-et-Cher has an important number of historic châteaux, including the following:
Château de Blois
Château de Chaumont
Château de Chambord
Château de Cheverny

See also
Cantons of the Loir-et-Cher department
Communes of the Loir-et-Cher department
Arrondissements of the Loir-et-Cher department

References

External links
  Prefecture website 
  Departmental Council website

  

 
1790 establishments in France
Departments of Centre-Val de Loire
States and territories established in 1790